Tait is a Scottish surname which means "pleasure" or "delight." The origins of the name can be traced back as far as 1100. Notable people with the surname include:

 Alan Tait (born 1964), Scottish rugby player and coach
 Alasdair Tait, British cellist and teacher
 Alex Tait (disambiguation), several persons
 Alex Tait (cricketer) (born 1972), New Zealand cricketer
 Alex Tait (footballer) (born 1933), English footballer
 Alex Tait (rugby union) (born 1988), English rugby union player
 Alex Tait (poet) (born 1720), Scottish poet
 Alice Tait (born 1986), Australian swimmer
 Angus Tait (1919–2007), New Zealand businessman
 Ashley Tait (born 1975), British ice hockey player
 Archibald Tait (1811–1882), English archbishop
 Arthur Fitzwilliam Tait (1819–1905), American artist
 Barry Tait (born 1938), English  footballer 
 Blyth Tait (born 1961), New Zealand equestrian
 Bobby Tait (born 1938), Scottish footballer
 Bobby Tait (Cowdenbeath footballer) (c. 1886–1950), Scottish footballer
 Branford Taitt (1938 – 2013), Barbadian politician
 Campbell Tait (1886–1946), British naval officer colonial governor
 Cecilia Tait (born 1962),  Peruvian volleyball player and politician
 Charles Tait (politician) (1768–1835), American politician
 Charles Tait (film director) (1868–1933), Australian film director
 Chris Tait, Canadian singer–songwriter and producer
 David M. Tait (born 1947), Scottish airline executive
 David Tait (born 1987), English rugby union player
 Doug Taitt (1902–1970), Major League baseball player
 Douglas Tait (disambiguation), several persons
 Douglas Tait (illustrator), Canadian children's book illustrator
 Douglas Tait (actor), American actor, creature performer, stuntman and producer
 Edward Joseph Tait (1878–1948), Australian theatrical entrepreneur
 Eric Tait (born 1951), English football player and manager
 Francis M. Taitt (1862–1943), bishop of the Episcopal Diocese of Pennsylvania
 George Tait (1858–1882), English footballer
 Gerald Tait (1866–1938), Scottish sailor
 Glen Tait, Canadian politician
 Gordon Tait (1912–1999), British architect
 Gregor Tait (born 1979), Scottish swimmer
 Frank Samuel Tait (1883–1965), Australian theatre entrepreneur
 Frederick Guthrie Tait (1870–1900), Scottish soldier and amateur golfer
 Ian Tait (1926–2013), British general practitioner
 James Tait (disambiguation), several persons
 James Tait (historian) (1863–1944), English medieval historian
 James Brian Tait (1916–2007), British bomber pilot
 James Edward Tait (1886–1918), Scottish–Canadian soldier
 James Francis Tait (1926–2014), British endocrinologist
 James Sharp Tait (1912–1998), Scottish electrical engineer and academic administrator
 James Sinclair Tait (1849–1928), Canadian physician, author and politician
 James Haldane Tait (1771–1845), Scottish naval commander
 James Tait (1834–1915), English architect of Clarendon Park Congregational Church, Leicester
 Jason Tait, Canadian musician
 Jessie Tait (1928–2010), English ceramic designer
 Jock Tait (1886–1945), Scottish cricketer
 Joe Tait (1937–2021), American sports broadcaster
 John Tait (disambiguation), several persons
 John Tait (American football) (born 1975), professional football player
 John Tait (architect) (1787–1856), Scottish architect
 John Tait (entrepreneur) (1871–1955), Australian film and theatre entrepreneur
 John Tait (horseman) (1813–1888), racehorse owner/trainer in Australian Racing Hall of Fame
 John Tait (rugby union) (born 1973), Canadian rugby player
 John Tait (runner) (1888–1971), Olympic athlete
 John Guthrie Tait (1861–1945), Scottish educator and international rugby union player
 John W. Tait (born 1945), English Egyptologist
 John Barclay Tait (1900–1973), British hydrographist
 John Robinson Tait (1834–1909), American landscape painter, art critic, and travel writer
 John Tait (physiologist) (1878–1944), Scots-born professor of physiology
 John Guthrie Tait (1861–1945), Scottish educator and international rugby player
 Jordan Tait (born 1979), English footballer
 Katharine Tait (born 1923), British writer
 Kenneth Tait (1918–1941), New Zealand flying ace
 Lauren Tait (born 1996), Scottish netball player
 Laurie Taitt (1934–2006), British hurdler
 Lawson Tait (1845–1899), Scottish gynecologist
 Luke Tait (born 1981), Canadian rugby union player
 Lynn Taitt (1934–2010), Trinidad and Tobago reggae guitarist
 Margaret Tait (1918–1999), Scottish film maker and poet
 Marion Tait, ballerina and ballet mistress
 Mathew Tait (born 1986), English rugby union player
 Melanie Tait, Australian radio broadcaster, playwright and author
 Melbourne McTaggart Tait (1842–1917), Canadian lawyer and judge
 Merepeka Raukawa-Tait, New Zealand politician and activist
 Michael Tait (born 1966), American musician
 Mick Tait (born 1956), English footballer and  manager
 Nancy Tait (1920–2009), English activist
 Nevin Tait (1876–1961), Australian concert promoter and film producer
 Norman Tait (born 1941), Canadian artist and totem pole carver
 Paul Tait (disambiguation), several persons
 Paul Tait (footballer, born 1971), English midfielder for Birmingham City
 Paul Tait (footballer, born 1974), English striker for Northwich Victoria
 Percy Tait (born 1929), British motorcycle road racer and tester
 Peter Tait (disambiguation), several persons
 Peter Tait (physicist) (1831–1901), Scottish mathematical physicist
 Peter Tait (footballer) (1936–1990), English professional footballer
 Peter Tait (mayor) (1915–1996), New Zealand politician
 Peter Tait (radio presenter) (1950–2002), English radio presenter
 Peter Tait (rugby union) (1906–1980), Scottish rugby union player
 Peter Tait (sport shooter) (born 1949), Australian Paralympian
 Richard Tait, British journalist and academic
 Robert Tait (disambiguation), several persons
 Robert Lawson Tait (1845–1899), British medical pioneer
 Robert Tait (captain) (fl. 1793), Scottish naval officer
 Robin Tait (1940–1984), New Zealand discus thrower
 Roger Tait, New Zealand rugby league player
 Sarah Tait (1983–2016), Australian rower
 Shaun Tait (born 1983), Australian cricketer
 Sylvia Tait, Canadian  painter
 Thomas Tait (disambiguation), several persons
 Timothy M. P. Tait, Canadian/American physicist
 Tom Tait (volleyball), American volleyball coach
 Tommy Tait (disambiguation), several persons
 Tommy Tait (socialist) 
 Tommy Tait (footballer, born 1879) (1879–1942), Scottish international footballer for Sunderland
 Tommy Tait (footballer, born 1908) (1908–1976), English footballer for Sunderland, Manchester City
 Victor Hubert Tait (1892–1988), Canadian soldier and airman
 Viola Tait (1911–2002), Australian biographer
 William Tait (disambiguation), several persons
 William Auld Tait (1826–1900), Canadian pioneer and politician
 William W. Tait (born 1929), professor of philosophy at the University of Chicago
 William Tait (cricketer), New Zealand cricketer
 William Tait (footballer), Association football player during the 1890s and 1900s.
 William Tait (publisher) (1793–1864), known for Tait's Magazine
 William Tait (MP) (died 1800), Member of Parliament for Stirling Burghs

See also
Tate (surname)

References

Surnames of Scottish origin
Scottish surnames